The Highland School, also the Arthur W. Dalrymple School,  is a historic school building at 36 Grovers Avenue in Winthrop, Massachusetts.  The Georgian Revival two story brick building was built in 1920–21 to replace a nearby school that burned down in 1920.  It was built on the site of the Leighton Resort, a popular summer destination.  The school's later dedicatee was a local resident who taught at the school and later became Winthrop's superintendent of schools.

The building was added to the National Register of Historic Places in 2014.

See also
National Register of Historic Places listings in Suffolk County, Massachusetts

References

School buildings on the National Register of Historic Places in Massachusetts
Winthrop, Massachusetts
School buildings completed in 1921
Neoclassical architecture in Massachusetts
Buildings and structures in Suffolk County, Massachusetts
National Register of Historic Places in Suffolk County, Massachusetts
1921 establishments in Massachusetts